Glen Michael (born Cecil Buckland, 16 May 1926) is a British former children's television presenter and an entertainer. His career at Scottish Television spanned 26 years with the popular children's show Glen Michael's Cartoon Cavalcade.

Early career 
Michael was born in May 1926 in Devon, England. He began his career as an entertainer on stage for the army and worked his way up with his many shows that encompassed his talent for comedy, in particular, impersonations. Upon leaving his native England for the Scottish theatre circuit, he found further success in stage shows with comedians Rikki Fulton and Jack Milroy. Michael also made an uncredited appearance as "Larry" in the police drama The Blue Lamp in 1950; he and his date witnessed the shooting of Jack Warner (Dixon of Dock Green) as they entered a cinema.

Television years 
Michael eventually turned his attention to television, starring in many Scottish Television productions and dramas including:

 Living With Computers 
 Howard and Wyndham's Five Past Eight Show
 Over to Una, a comedy show with Una McLean
 Search for Beauty
 Grand Tour
 Taggart
 Friends and Neighbours
 Would You Believe It? (late 1970s)
 Francie and Josie - Michael played many parts, including Josie's cousin when Jack Milroy was ill
 The Rikki Fulton Hour
 High Living

He also appeared in several one-off plays for the BBC and STV.

Glen Michael's Cartoon Cavalcade

Michael achieved his best-known success with Glen Michael's Cartoon Cavalcade, which aired on Scottish Television for the first time on Wednesday 6 April 1966. 

The show is remembered by viewers in Central Scotland as their first exposure to many famous cartoons and for Michael's companions, Paladin the talking lamp, Totty the Robot and dogs Rudi and Rusti. Children's birthday greetings sent in by viewers was a regular popular feature, with Michael's production team also sending birthday cards to those who could not have their greetings read on air.

Although broadcast in the STV region, Cavalcade also aired periodically in the neighbouring Grampian Television region during the 1970s and 1980s. In its early years, the show was also carried in southern England by Southern Television (1966-67) and Westward Television (1967-69), allowing Michael to broadcast to his native Devon.

Originally airing at around 5pm on weekdays, the show moved to a Saturday timeslot in 1972, before moving again to Sunday afternoons in January 1974. The programme returned to a Saturday morning slot in September 1985, only to return to its Sunday timeslot the following April. In its last few years, Cavalcade moved to an earlier half-hour slot at 10.45am on Sunday mornings.

After over 26 years on air, Glen Michael's Cartoon Cavalcade was axed in December 1992 and replaced by new local children's programming, such as Wemyss Bay 902101 and Skoosh. A few months after its final broadcast, a special one-off edition was released on VHS, featuring a selection of cartoons from the Paramount library.

Other work 
Michael presented a weekly show on Saga FM every Sunday, playing songs from stage shows and classic records. When Saga FM was bought by Real Radio company GMG Radio, Michael decided not to move across to Smooth Radio. Michael also starred in several pantomimes with Jack Milroy and completed many runs at the Pavilion Theatre in Glasgow, the Gaiety Theatre, Ayr and the Edinburgh Kings in various productions and plays. Michael made a brief cameo in an episode of the BBC series VideoGaiden, playing himself in a speaking role. In the episode, Michael receives a coconut and some flowers in the mail (in an attempt to recreate the Nintendo game Animal Crossing) and sends a thankful letter in response.

Later life 
With the end of "Cavalcade", Michael continued working, taking a touring version of the show around Scotland to primary schools. He was assisted by his wife of many years, Beryl. Mark Millar, writer of the comic book Kick-Ass, helped Michael to get a cameo role in the film version of the comic-book series. Miller said that Cartoon Cavalcade inspired him to become a writer and none of his comic books would exist if it wasn't for Michael and his show. His part, however, was cut from the final edit. Michael said, "I never expected to be in it at all. I think it was meant as a gesture. I think they were trying to make me feel like a real star. I had a trailer which was as big as a coach." Michael did attend the premiere of the movie in London. In 2008 Michael released an autobiography called Life's a Cavalcade, in which he tells how he worked his way to becoming a performer, his life in the army and how he ended up in Scotland.

References

External links 
 
 
 

1926 births
Living people
British radio personalities
British television presenters
Mass media people from Devon